Richard Grey, 3rd Earl of Kent KG (1481 – 3 May 1524) was an English peer.

Family
He was a son of George Grey, 2nd Earl of Kent and his first wife Anne Woodville. His maternal grandparents were Richard Woodville, 1st Earl Rivers and Jacquetta of Luxembourg.

His father was secondly married to Catherine Herbert. His paternal half-brothers included Henry Grey, 4th Earl of Kent. His mother was previously married to William Bourchier, Viscount Bourchier. His maternal half-siblings included Henry Bourchier, 2nd Earl of Essex and Cecily Bourchier. Cecily was mother to Walter Devereux, 1st Viscount Hereford.

Marriages
Richard married twice. His first wife was Elizabeth Hussey. She was a daughter of Sir William Hussey and Elizabeth Berkeley. Her father had served as Attorney General for England and Wales from 16 June 1471 to 7 May 1481 and Lord Chief Justice of England and Wales from 7 May 1481 to his death on 24 November 1495. His second wife was Margaret Fynche, daughter of James Fynche. There were no known children from either marriage.

Life
He served as a Justice of the Peace in Bedfordshire, Buckinghamshire and Huntingdonshire from 1504. He was created a Knight of the Garter in 1505, alongside the latter Henry Stafford, 1st Earl of Wiltshire. He was Captain of the Army in France in 1513 and 1514 and accompanied Henry VIII to his meeting with Francis I of France at the Field of the Cloth of Gold in 1520.

Richard wound up heavily in debt, probably through gambling, and was forced to alienate most of his property. A good part ended up in the hands of his affine cousin (Richard's mother was the sister of Elizabeth Woodville, Henry's mother-in-law), King Henry VII (including the Marcher Lordship of Ruthin, which he sold directly to the King); historians disagree regarding what this says about the relationship of King Henry with the aristocracy.

Richard died childless and was succeeded as earl by his half-brother Henry. Henry tried, with little success, to reacquire the property Richard had sold, and had to live as a modest gentleman, never formally taking title as earl.

Notes

References

External links
Will of Sir William Hussey, PROB 11/10/592, proved 4 July 1496, National Archives 11 December 2013
Will of Dame Elizabeth Hussey, widow, PROB 11/14/415, proved 11 December 1504, National Archives 11 December 2013
The Complete Peerage

External links
A Grey family pedigree

1481 births
1524 deaths
Earls of Kent (1465 creation)
Knights of the Garter
Richard
16th-century English nobility
Barons Grey of Ruthin